Rawle Cox (born September 5, 1960) is an American field hockey player. He competed in the men's tournament at the 1984 Summer Olympics.

References

External links
 

1960 births
Living people
American male field hockey players
Olympic field hockey players of the United States
Field hockey players at the 1984 Summer Olympics